Broughton railway station may refer to:

 Broughton railway station (England), in Broughton, Lancashire, closed in 1840
 Broughton railway station (Scotland), in Broughton, Scottish Borders, closed in the 1950s
 Broughton railway station (Wales), in Broughton, Flintshire, proposed since 2013

See also
 Broughton Astley railway station
 Broughton & Bretton railway station
 Broughton Cross railway station
 Broughton Gifford Halt railway station
 Broughton Lane railway station
 Broughton Skeog railway station
 Broughton-in-Furness railway station
 Boughton railway station